The town of Makale is the administrative centre of Tana Toraja Regency, in South Sulawesi Province of Indonesia. The town had about 39,040 inhabitants in mid 2021. It is in the northern part of South Sulawesi and can be reached by bus from Makassar.

History
Makale used to be a place for trading goods and then became one of the biggest towns in Tana Toraja.

Economy
People in Makale mostly work as businessmen. They trade livestock, rice, and pigs. There is a six-day cyclic market that has become the main attraction of the city.

Transportation
This town can be reached by bus from Makassar using inter-city transport. It takes around eight hours from Makassar to Makale, Tana Toraja.

References

External links
 Traditional Market of Makale, Tana Toraja, Indonesia

External links 

Populated places in South Sulawesi
Tana Toraja Regency
Regency seats of South Sulawesi